West Kerry or Kerry West may refer to:

The western part of County Kerry, in Ireland
West Kerry GAA
West Kerry (UK Parliament constituency)